Big John is a fossilized Triceratops horridus skeleton discovered in South Dakota's Hell Creek geological formation in 2014. It is the largest  known Triceratops skeleton, according to the team that assembled the fossil. Big John's 2021 auction price of €6.6 million (US$7.7 million) made it the most expensive Triceratops skeleton.

Discovery and description
The skeleton is roughly 66 million years old, and was discovered in May 2014 by paleontologist and professional fossil hunter Walter W. Stein. The fossil was located on a private ranch in Mud Butte, South Dakota, part of the Hell Creek geological formation. After only "10–15 minutes of searching" at the discovery site, Stein noticed a debris field of skeleton fragments leading into a hillside. The remains of a brow horn suggested that the fossil was a large Triceratops, one of the most common dinosaurs found in the Hell Creek Formation. The remains were scattered over an area of 100 square metres.

The fossil's excavation was completed by August 2015. The skeleton is over 60% complete, with a skull that is 75% complete. It was nicknamed "Big John", after the owner of the ranch where it was found.

The two top horns are over a metre long. According to Zoic, the team that assembled the fossil, Big John is about 5–10% larger than any other known Triceratops. It bears the mark of a traumatic lesion on its collar, possibly the result of a fight with another Triceratops. A close examination of the lesion under an electron microscope suggested that the bone had partially healed, and so was not the cause of death.

Assembly 
The remains of Big John were purchased for €150,000 and assembled over eight or nine months by the Zoic workshop in Trieste, Italy, who had previously restored two Triceratops skeletons. More than 200 bones were pieced together. The assembly process began in January 2021 and was live-streamed on the company's social media channels. Zoic modelled the dinosaur's posture after the Charging Bull bronze sculpture on Wall Street. They originally considered assembling the skeleton to stand on only two legs, but this was not possible given the weight of its skull. Flavio Bacchia, who supervised the assembly, estimated that the Triceratops was about 60 years old and weighed six tons at the time of its death.

Public display

The skull first went on public display in Trieste in February 2021. The fully-assembled skeleton was briefly displayed in Trieste, from 30 July to 1 August 2021. This three-day exhibition was celebrated with the release of a children's book, A dinosaur walking around Trieste, written by Barbara Battistelli and illustrated by Luca Vergerio and Gianpaolo di Silvestro. From mid-September to mid-October, the skeleton was displayed at the Rue des Archives in Paris, France.

Auction and sale
On 21 October 2021, the skeleton was sold for €6.6 million (US$7.7 million) by the Hôtel Drouot auction house in Paris, exceeding the expected sale price of US$1.4–1.7 million. It was purchased by a then-unnamed US collector, later revealed to be Siddhartha Pagidipati, who beat out 10 other bidders. The high sale price signalled increasing demand for dinosaur fossils among private collectors. Walter Stein, who discovered the fossil, was surprised by its high auction price, and stated, "I would have felt better about it had it gone to a museum. Hopefully the new owner will put it on public display somewhere soon, so others can love the specimen like we did."

The auctioneer for the sale, Alexandre Giquello, said that skyrocketing prices for dinosaur fossils are "creating a new market." Some scientists, including Francis Duranthon, from the Toulouse Museum of Natural History, and Paul Barrett, from the Natural History Museum, London, expressed concern that this higher demand was pushing prices beyond what public museums can afford and would make specimens inaccessible to researchers. Denver Fowler, curator of the Badlands Dinosaur Museum at Dickinson Museum Center, questioned the fossil's scientific importance and argued that its private ownership made it impossible to verify any research based on the skeleton.

Big John is part of a larger run up in auction prices for dinosaur remains, and is the most expensive non-Tyrannosaurus fossil ever sold at auction. However, its price was substantially lower than the $27.5 million ($31.8 million with fees and costs) paid in 2020 for the Tyrannosaurus rex skeleton named Stan.

In January 2023, it was announced that Tampa businessman Siddhartha Pagidipati and his family would be loaning Big John to the Glazer Children's Museum in Tampa, Florida for a three-year public exhibition.

See also

 List of dinosaur specimens with nicknames
 List of dinosaur specimens sold at auction

References

Notes

Citations

Further reading

External links
  Streamed live on October 21, 2021.
 Big John @BigJohnTrieste  · History Museum (in Italian) via Facebook
 Discover Trieste is with Big John and Il Piccolo in Piazza Unità d'Italia. (in Italian)

Dinosaur fossils
Individual animal corpses
2014 in paleontology
Cretaceous fossil record